Kamil Piątkowski (born 21 June 2000) is a Polish professional footballer who plays as a defender for Belgian First Division A club Gent, on loan from Red Bull Salzburg, and the Poland national team.

International career
Piątkowski made his debut for Poland on 28 March 2021 in a World Cup qualifier against Andorra.

Career statistics

Club

International

Honours
Raków Częstochowa
Polish Cup: 2020–21

Red Bull Salzburg
Austrian Bundesliga: 2021–22
Austrian Cup: 2021–22

Individual
Ekstraklasa Young Player of the Season: 2020–21
Ekstraklasa Young Player of the Month: March 2021, April 2021

References

2000 births
People from Jasło
Living people
Polish footballers
Poland youth international footballers
Poland under-21 international footballers
Poland international footballers
Association football defenders
Zagłębie Lubin players
Raków Częstochowa players
FC Red Bull Salzburg players
K.A.A. Gent players
III liga players
Ekstraklasa players
Austrian Football Bundesliga players
Belgian Pro League players
UEFA Euro 2020 players
Polish expatriate footballers
Expatriate footballers in Austria
Polish expatriate sportspeople in Austria
Expatriate footballers in Belgium
Polish expatriate sportspeople in Belgium